Kookaburra is an Australian sounding rocket consisting of a Lupus-rocket as first stage and a Musca rocket as second stage. The Kookaburra was launched 33 times, from Woomera, South Australia, and from Gan, which is an island located in Addu Atoll, the southernmost atoll of the Maldives and also from Kelaa Island, again another island located up in the north of Maldives.

Technical data 
Apogee: 75 km
Total Mass: 100 kg
Core Diameter: 0.12 m
Total Length: 3.40 m

External links 
 https://web.archive.org/web/20081015145230/http://astronautix.com/lvs/kooburra.htm

Sounding rockets of Australia